Takis Christoforidis (1914–1973) was a Greek actor and cousin of Periklis Christoforidis.

Filmography

Selected filmography:
O thisavros tou makariti (1959)
To exypno pouli (1961) ..... Filotas
O skliros andras (1961) ..... police officer
A Matter of Earnestness (1965) ..... Efstathiou
 Ah! Kai na 'moun antras (1966) ..... Stella's boss
 Voitheia! O Vengos faneros praktor 000 (1967) ..... armaments director
Thema syneidiseos (1973)

Sources
Musipedia

External links

1914 births
1973 deaths
Greek male film actors
Male actors from Attica
20th-century Greek male actors
Constantinopolitan Greeks
Emigrants from the Ottoman Empire to Greece
Male actors from Istanbul